Millwood Township is an inactive township in Lincoln County, in the U.S. state of Missouri.

Millwood Township was established in 1856, taking its name from the community of Millwood, Missouri.

References

Townships in Missouri
Townships in Lincoln County, Missouri